The Latvian Russian Union (LRU) (LKS) is a political party in Latvia supported mainly by ethnic Russians and other Russian-speaking minorities. The co-chairpersons of the Latvian Russian Union are Miroslav Mitrofanov and Tatjana Ždanoka.

The party emphasizes issues important to the Russian minority in Latvia. It requests the granting of Latvian citizenship to all of Latvia's remaining non-citizens and supports Russian and Latgalian as co-official languages in municipalities where at least 20% of the population are native speakers of such a language. It supports stronger ties with both Russia and the European Union, and was the only major political organization to oppose Latvia's membership in NATO.

History

As ForHRUL (1998–2014)

As an electoral alliance (1998–2007) 
After the municipal elections, ForHRUL became part of Riga's city government and National Harmony Party member Sergey Dolgopolov became the deputy mayor of Riga City Council.

During this period, ForHRUL's most prominent leaders were Jānis Jurkāns, Alfrēds Rubiks and Tatjana Ždanoka. Jurkāns was a leader of the Popular Front of Latvia and founder of the National Harmony Party; Rubiks and Ždanoka were prominent as leaders of the Interfront movement, the Latvian branch of the Communist Party of the Soviet Union and the federalist movement in Latvia in the early 1990s. They were fairly popular in the Russian community but very unpopular among ethnic Latvians. ForHRUL therefore remained in opposition, because a coalition with Rubiks or Ždanoka was seen as a political suicide by most other elected parties.

ForHRUL partially broke up in 2003. The National Harmony Party was the first to leave the alliance and the Socialist Party followed half a year later. The latter was composed of dissident Socialist Party and National Harmony Party members, like Yakov Pliner, who opposed the decision to quit the alliance. This reduced grouping had only 6 members of the Saeima (out of 25 that the alliance had before the breakup). ForHRUL was the main force supporting the 2003-2005 activities of the Headquarters for the Protection of Russian Schools.

At the first Latvian election to the European Parliament in 2004, ForHRUL gained one seat, held by Tatjana Ždanoka, who sat with the Greens–European Free Alliance group in the European Parliament. It also proposed the idea of a Europe-wide party of ethnic Russians. ForHRUL supported a federal Europe, with a "common economic and political space from Lisbon to Vladivostok".

As a single party (2007–2014) 
In 2007, ForHRUL was transformed into a single party that retained the name and identity of the old electoral alliance. In recent years the party's support has declined as ethnic Russian voters have switched allegiance to the Harmony party, successor to the National Harmony Party. At the 2010 parliamentary election, the party lost its representation in the Latvian Parliament.

In 2011, the party launched an unsuccessful popular initiative on amending the law governing Latvian nationality. The Central Electoral Commission considered the proposed amendment to be incompatible with the Constitution of Latvia and the process of collecting signatures for a referendum on the proposals was suspended. This decision was eventually upheld by the Constitutional Court of Latvia and the Supreme Court of Latvia. It also supported the 2012 initiative to make Russian a co-official language in Latvia.

As Latvian Russian Union (2014–present) 
In January 2014, ForHRUL changed its name to the Latvian Russian Union. At the 2014 European Parliament election, it retained its single seat in the European Parliament. The party supported the annexation of Crimea by Russia in 2014 and has taken a pro-Russian stance in the subsequent Russo-Ukrainian War. In August 2014 the party signed a cooperation agreement with the Crimean branch of Russian Unity to "strengthen the unity of Russian world".

In July 2018, Ždanoka resigned her mandate in the European Parliament to focus on the 2018 Latvian parliamentary election and was succeeded by Miroslav Mitrofanov. With Andrejs Mamikins as their prime minister candidate Latvian Russian Union gained 3.2% votes, failing to win any seats in Saeima, but qualifying for state funding of almost 20 000 euros a year that the party would not be able to receive since it does not possess an account in a credit institution registered in Latvia as required by the law. In 2020, the party finally succeeded in obtaining an account in a Latvian bank.

In the 2019 European Parliament election, LRU received 6.24% of the votes and gained one seat, held by Tatjana Ždanoka who personally received 18,098 plusses and was crossed out 739 times. In the 2020 Riga City Council election, the party gained 6.5% of the votes and re-entered the Riga City Council with four seats.

On April 8, 2022, the European Free Alliance suspended LRU's membership in the party due to "fundamental disagreements" regarding the 2022 Russian invasion of Ukraine, including Ždanoka voting against the European Parliament Resolution condemning it. The same month a 2013 post from the LRU council member Jevgēņijs Osipovs resurfaced and was shared by him and other members of LRU, in which he threatened with "war" if the Monument to the Liberators of Soviet Latvia and Riga from the German Fascist Invaders was moved "by even a millimetre".

LRU received a warning from the State Security Service for activities "aimed at justifying violations of foreign policy and international law by Russia, as well as the dissemination of propaganda messages". The party's leadership responded by warning its members "to refrain from speaking, distributing or publishing news that reflects Russia's view of this aggressive war, and to avoid publishing news from unsafe sources at all." The Corruption Prevention and Combating Bureau informed LRU that the State Security Service warning could be regarded as grounds for halting state funding to the party.

Election results

Legislative elections

European Parliament

Riga City Council

See also 
 Giulietto Chiesa, an Italian candidate on the ForHRUL list for the 2009 European Parliament elections.

References

External links
Official website 

Russian political parties in Latvia
European Free Alliance
Political parties established in 1998
Russian nationalism in Latvia
Russian minority interests parties
1998 establishments in Latvia